Aymen Mahious (born September 15, 1997) is an Algerian footballer who plays as a striker for USM Alger in the Algerian Ligue Professionnelle 1 and the Algerian national team.

Club career
On May 31, Mahious joined to USM Alger for three seasons, coming from CA Batna for 3,000,000 DA. He made his debut for the team in the CAF Confederation Cup during a win against Rayon Sports, later in the Arab Club Champions Cup Mahious scored the winning goal against Al-Quwa Al-Jawiya his first goal with the club. On August 14, He made his debut in the Ligue 1 against DRB Tadjenanet as a substitute and made an assist for Zakaria Benchaâ in 3–1 victory. On September 21, and in the first game as a starter Mahious managed to score his first goal in the Ligue 1 against AS Ain M'lila in 3–0 victory.

On July 1, Mahious returned to USM Alger after 6 months on loan to AS Ain M'lila, due to the financial crisis Mahious became an important player in the team On 25 August 2019, scoring his first goal in CAF Champions League against AS Sonidep in a 3–1 home win. Then he led USM Alger to victory against Gor Mahia outside the home by scoring a double. On 5 January 2020, in the Algerian Cup Mahious scored his first hat-trick in his career and made an assist for Billel Benhammouda against USM Khenchela in 6–1 victory.

International career
On 26 March 2019, Mahious scored his first goals with Algeria under-23 national team at the 2019 Africa U-23 Cup of Nations qualification against Equatorial Guinea in 3–1 victory. But Algeria failed to qualify for the finals after the elimination against Ghana. in 2019 Mahious calls for the first time for the Algeria A' national team in the 2020 CHAN qualification against Morocco. and participated as a substitute in the place of Lamine Abid. On January 2, 2023, Mahious was selected for the 28-man squad to participate in the 2022 African Nations Championship. Mahious became the first player to score in Nelson Mandela Stadium in the opening of the CHAN 2022 against Libya A'. In the final Mahious missed a decisive penalty shootout which was the reason for losing the title, Mahious was criticized for the way he takes penalties, and he apologized to the Algerian people but he said that he would continue to take penalty kicks in that way. Mahious won the Golden Boot Award at the end of the tournament and was included in the squad for Best XI.

Career statistics

Club

International goals

With Algeria U23

With Algeria A'

Honours
Individual
 African Nations Championship Best XI: 2022
 African Nations Championship Golden Boot Award: 2022

References

External links
 
 NFT Profile

1997 births
Living people
Algerian footballers
Algeria international footballers
Algeria under-23 international footballers
Algerian Ligue Professionnelle 1 players
Algerian Ligue 2 players
CA Batna players
USM Alger players
Association football forwards
AS Aïn M'lila players
21st-century Algerian people
2022 African Nations Championship players
Algeria A' international footballers